Orlando Rosa (born 27 December 1977) is a Puerto Rican former wrestler who competed in the 1996 Summer Olympics. In the 1995 Pan American Games 90.0 kg. freestyle category he finished sixth.

References

External links
 

1967 births
Living people
Olympic wrestlers of Puerto Rico
Wrestlers at the 1996 Summer Olympics
Puerto Rican male sport wrestlers
American sportsmen
Pan American Games competitors for Puerto Rico
Wrestlers at the 1995 Pan American Games